The Law of Hostages was a 1799 law enacted by the French Directory, during the final stages of the French Revolution in July–October 1799, in order to strengthen its power in regions that the Directory viewed as problematic. The law allowed local authorities to draw up lists of "hostages" who would be held responsible for certain criminal offences, and was particularly intended to be used against notables suspected of threatening the Directory's authority. Since local authorities were responsible for the law's execution, it was not always effective since local authorities often sympathized with those it was intended to be used against or they refrained because they did not want to cause strife in their community.

The law was repealed in November 1799 after Napoleon took power in the Coup of 18 Brumaire.

See also
Law of Suspects

References

1799 events of the French Revolution
Hostages
1799 in France
Law of France